Taraxacum arcticum, the arctic dandelion,  is a species of flowering plant belonging to the family Asteraceae. Its native range is Greenland, Northern Europe, Northern Asia and the Northern Russian Far East.

Description
Taraxacum arcticum is a moderately long-lived perennial with a whitish taproot and a rosette of five to eight green leaves, sometimes growing solitarily and sometimes somewhat matted. The inflorescences grow direct from the rosette, each with a long pinkish stem that often curves downwards and has transverse wrinkles. Each flowering stem bears a single flower head consisting of multiple florets which are bisexual; the ligules are white or creamy-white and have a purple streak on the underside. The brownish-black fruits have a number of shallow ridges and are capped by white pappi which form parachutes.

Distribution and habitat
Taraxacum arcticum mainly occurs in the arctic regions of northern Europe and Asia. Its range extends from northern Greenland and Svalbard to the Chukchi Peninsula in northeastern Siberia. It grows in damp meadows and on heaths, on level or sloping land, often in positions with early snow protection or enriched with bird droppings. It grows in acid, neutral or alkaline soils.

Reproduction
In general, Taraxacum sets seed whether or not the flowers have been pollinated. In some species the pollen appears ripe and yellow, and in others it is green or blackish-green, but in both types, the pollen appears to be non-functional. In the case of the boreal and arctic species, only Taraxacum holmenianum is suspected of pollination; while T. arcticum is among the species that are thought not to rely on it, but the plant flowers prolifically and produces plenty of viable seed, which is widely dispersed by the wind. There is also limited local dispersal by fragmentation of the fleshy roots.

References

arcticum
Flora of Northern Europe
Flora of North European Russia
Flora of Siberia
Flora of the Russian Far East
Flora of Greenland
Plants described in 1906